Raj Mangal Mishra was an Indian politician. He was elected to the Lok Sabha, the lower house of the Parliament of India from Gopalganj, Bihar as a member of the Janata Dal.

References

External links
Official biographical sketch on the Parliament of India website

1920s births
1993 deaths
Year of birth uncertain
Janata Dal politicians
Lok Sabha members from Bihar
India MPs 1989–1991